Leandro Martínez Figueredo  (born June 28, 1978) is a Cuban professional baseball pitcher for Alazanes de Granma in the Cuban National Series.

Martínez played for the Cuba national baseball team at the 2012 Haarlem Baseball Week and 2017 World Baseball Classic.

References

External links

1978 births
Living people
Cuban baseball players
Baseball pitchers
Alazanes de Granma players
Tigres de Ciego de Avila players
2017 World Baseball Classic players
[[Category:People from Granma